Unification Shoes are shoes of which the soles are made in South Korea and the uppers in North Korea. The shoes are marketed under the "Stafild" brand name in South Korea. The North Korean portion of the shoes is manufactured at the Kaesong Industrial Region.

See also
 Korean reunification
 Unification flag

External links
 Stafild corporate website, in Korean
 Hankyoreh article about Unification Shoes, in Korean
 French video of a day in the Stafild workshop in Kaesong

Shoe brands
North Korea–South Korea relations